Confidential is an album by the Eyeliners, released on 27 May 1997 by Sympathy for the Record Industry.

Track listing
"You're All Wrong"
"Anywhere But Here"
"Won't Be Long"
"Big Scoop"
"Six Years"
"Broke My Heart"
"High School"
"Secret Spy"
"Too Late"
"Postal"
"Headache"
"Instramatic"

References

1997 albums
Sympathy for the Record Industry albums